The Reformed Church is a church in Ilişua, Sălaj, Romania, completed in the 15th century.

References

External links
 Ilişua, Reformed church

Reformed churches in Romania
Historic monuments in Sălaj County
Churches in Sălaj County
15th-century churches in Romania